Orenaia lugubralis is a species of moth in the family Crambidae. It is found in France, Italy, Switzerland, Austria, Slovenia and Germany.

References

Moths described in 1857
Evergestinae
Moths of Europe